Ops Selamat (Operation Safe) (formerly Ops Sikap (Operation Attitude) and Ops Statik) is a traffic safety operation carried out by the Royal Malaysian Police to ensure safety on all roads in Malaysia during festive seasons such as Hari Raya Aidilfitri, Deepavali, Christmas Day and Chinese New Year. This operation began in 2001 and also involves the collaboration of the Malaysian Fire and Rescue Department, Malaysian Civil Defence Department, St. John Ambulance of Malaysia, Ministry of Health (Malaysia), Malaysian Road Transport Department (JPJ), Land Public Transport Commission (SPAD) and the National Anti-Drugs Agency (NADA).

List of operations

Ops Sikap (2001 - 2011)

Ops Selamat (2012 - present)

See also
 Malaysians Unite For Road Safety

Law enforcement in Malaysia
Traffic law
Law of Malaysia